The 2011 Niger State gubernatorial election was the 7th gubernatorial election of Niger State. Held on April 26, 2011, the People's Democratic Party nominee Mu'azu Babangida Aliyu won the election, defeating Ibrahim Bako Shettima of the Congress for Progressive Change.

Results 
A total of 7 candidates contested in the election. Mu'azu Babangida Aliyu from the People's Democratic Party won the election, defeating Ibrahim Bako Shettima from the Congress for Progressive Change. Valid votes was 905,829.

References 

Niger State gubernatorial elections
Niger gubernatorial